Ghiring Rural Municipality (Ghiring Gaupalika) (Nepali: घिरिङ्ग गाउँपालिका) is a Gaunpalika in Tanahaun District in Gandaki Province of Nepal. On 12 March 2017, the government of Nepal implemented a new local administrative structure, in which VDCs have been replaced with municipal and Village Councils. Ghiring is one of these 753 local units.

Demographics
At the time of the 2011 Nepal census, Ghiring Rural Municipality had a population of 19,318. Of these, 48.0% spoke Magar, 42.6% Nepali, 7.5% Newar, 1.3% Gurung, 0.2% Bhojpuri, 0.1% Doteli, 0.1% Kumhali, 0.1% Maithili and 0.2% other languages as their first language.

In terms of ethnicity/caste, 50.7% were Magar, 10.1% Kami, 9.7% Kumal, 8.2% Newar, 4.9% Hill Brahmin, 4.8% Sarki, 3.5% Chhetri, 3.5% Damai/Dholi, 1.4% Gurung, 0.8% Darai, 0.5% Badi, 0.5% Gharti/Bhujel, 0.3% Sanyasi/Dasnami, 0.3% Thakuri, 0.3% Yadav, 0.1% Sunuwar, 0.1% Tharu and 0.2% others.

In terms of religion, 92.7% were Hindu, 6.3% Buddhist, 0.6% Christian, 0.1% Muslim and 0.4% others.

In terms of literacy, 67.5% could read and write, 1.7% could only read and 30.6% could neither read nor write.

References 

Tanahun District
Gandaki Province
Rural municipalities of Nepal established in 2017
Rural municipalities in Tanahun District